A boat is a watercraft of a large range of types and sizes, but generally smaller than a ship, which is distinguished by its larger size, shape, cargo or passenger capacity, or its ability to carry boats.

Small boats are typically found on inland waterways such as rivers and lakes, or in protected coastal areas. However, some boats, such as the whaleboat, were intended for use in an offshore environment. In modern naval terms, a boat is a vessel small enough to be carried aboard a ship.

Boats vary in proportion and construction methods with their intended purpose, available materials, or local traditions. Canoes have been used since prehistoric times and remain in use throughout the world for transportation, fishing, and sport. Fishing boats vary widely in style partly to match local conditions. Pleasure craft used in recreational boating include ski boats, pontoon boats, and sailboats. House boats may be used for vacationing or long-term residence. Lighters are used to move cargo to and from large ships unable to get close to shore. Lifeboats have rescue and safety functions.

Boats can be propelled by manpower (e.g. rowboats and paddle boats), wind  (e.g. sailboats), and inboard/outboard motors (including gasoline, diesel, and electric).

History 

After Homo erectus possibly used watercraft more than a million years ago to cross straits between landmasses, boats have served as transportation far into pre-historic times.  Circumstantial evidence, such as the early settlement of Australia over 40,000 years ago, findings in Crete dated 130,000 years ago and in Flores dated to 900,000 years ago, suggest that boats have been used since pre-historic times. The earliest boats are thought to have been dugouts,  and the oldest boats found by archaeological excavation date from around 7,000 to 10,000 years ago. The oldest recovered boat in the world, the Pesse canoe, found in the Netherlands, is a dugout made from the hollowed tree trunk of a Pinus sylvestris that was constructed somewhere between 8200 and 7600 BC. This canoe is exhibited in the Drents Museum in Assen, Netherlands. Other very old dugout boats have also been recovered. Rafts have operated for at least 8,000 years. A 7,000-year-old seagoing reed boat has been found at site H3 in Kuwait. Boats were used between 4000 and 3000 BC in Sumer, where a 4000-year old boat has been excavated at Uruk, ancient Egypt, and in the Indian Ocean.

Boats played an important role in the commerce between the Indus Valley civilization and Mesopotamia. Evidence of varying models of boats has also been discovered at various Indus Valley archaeological sites. Uru craft originate in Beypore, a village in south Calicut, Kerala, in southwestern India. This type of mammoth wooden ship was constructed solely of teak, with a transport capacity of 400 tonnes. The ancient Arabs and Greeks used such boats as trading vessels.

The historians Herodotus, Pliny the Elder, and Strabo record the use of boats for commerce, travel, and military purposes.

Types

Boats can be categorized by their means of propulsion. These divide into:
 Unpowered. This involves drifting with the tide or a river current.
 Powered by the crew-members on board, using oars, paddles or a punting pole or quant.
 Powered by sail.
 Towedeither by humans or animals from a river or canal bank (or in very shallow water, by walking on the sea or river bed) or by another vessel.
 Powered by machinery, such as internal combustion engines, steam engines or by batteries and an electric motor.Any one vessel may use more than one of these methods at different times on in combination.

A number of large vessels are usually referred to as boats. Submarines are a prime example.  Other types of large vessels which are traditionally called boats include Great Lakes freighters, riverboats, and ferryboats. Though large enough to carry their own boats and heavy cargoes, these vessels are designed for operation on inland or protected coastal waters.

Terminology

The hull is the main, and in some cases only, structural component of a boat.  It provides both capacity and buoyancy. The keel is a boat's "backbone", a lengthwise structural member to which the perpendicular frames are fixed. On some boats a deck covers the hull, in part or whole. While a ship often has several decks, a boat is unlikely to have more than one. Above the deck are often lifelines connected to stanchions, bulwarks perhaps topped by gunnels, or some combination of the two. A cabin may protrude above the deck forward, aft, along the centerline, or covering much of the length of the boat. Vertical structures dividing the internal spaces are known as bulkheads.

The forward end of a boat is called the bow, the aft end the stern. Facing forward the right side is referred to as starboard and the left side as port.

Building materials 

Until the mid-19th century most boats were made of natural materials, primarily wood, although reed, bark and animal skins were also used. Early boats include the bound-reed style of boat seen in Ancient Egypt, the birch bark canoe, the animal hide-covered kayak and coracle and the dugout canoe made from a single log.

By the mid-19th century, many boats had been built with iron or steel frames but still planked in wood. In 1855 ferro-cement boat construction was patented by the French, who coined the name "ferciment". This is a system by which a steel or iron wire framework is built in the shape of a boat's hull and covered over with cement. Reinforced with bulkheads and other internal structure it is strong but heavy, easily repaired, and, if sealed properly, will not leak or corrode.

As the forests of Britain and Europe continued to be over-harvested to supply the keels of larger wooden boats, and the Bessemer process (patented in 1855) cheapened the cost of steel, steel ships and boats began to be more common. By the 1930s boats built entirely of steel from frames to plating were seen replacing wooden boats in many industrial uses and fishing fleets. Private recreational boats of steel remain uncommon. In 1895 WH Mullins produced steel boats of galvanized iron and by 1930 became the world's largest producer of pleasure boats.

Mullins also offered boats in aluminum from 1895 through 1899 and once again in the 1920s, but it wasn't until the mid-20th century that aluminium gained widespread popularity. Though much more expensive than steel, aluminum alloys exist that do not corrode in salt water, allowing a similar load carrying capacity to steel at much less weight.

Around the mid-1960s, boats made of fiberglass (aka "glassfibre") became popular, especially for recreational boats. Fiberglass is also known as "GRP" (glass-reinforced plastic) in the UK, and "FRP" (for fiber-reinforced plastic) in the US. Fiberglass boats are strong, and do not rust, corrode, or rot. Instead, they are susceptible to structural degradation from sunlight and extremes in temperature over their lifespan. Fiberglass structures can be made stiffer with sandwich panels, where the fiberglass encloses a lightweight core such as balsa or foam.

Cold molding is a modern construction method, using wood as the structural component. In one cold molding process, very thin strips of wood are layered over a form. Each layer is coated with resin, followed by another directionally alternating layer laid on top. Subsequent layers may be stapled or otherwise mechanically fastened to the previous, or weighted or vacuum bagged to provide compression and stabilization until the resin sets. An alternative process uses thin sheets of plywood shaped over a disposable male mold, and coated with epoxy.

Propulsion

The most common means of boat propulsion are as follows:
 Engine
 Inboard motor
 Stern drive (Inboard/outboard)
 Outboard motor
 Paddle wheel
 Water jet (jetboat, personal water craft)
 Fan (hovercraft, air boat)
 Man (rowing, paddling, setting pole etc.)
 Wind (sailing)

Buoyancy

A boat displaces its weight in water, regardless whether it is made of wood, steel, fiberglass, or even concrete.  If weight is added to the boat, the volume of the hull drawn below the waterline will increase to keep the balance above and below the surface equal.  Boats have a natural or designed level of buoyancy.  Exceeding it will cause the boat first to ride lower in the water, second to take on water more readily than when properly loaded, and ultimately, if overloaded by any combination of structure, cargo, and water, sink.

As commercial vessels must be correctly loaded to be safe, and as the sea becomes less buoyant in brackish areas such as the Baltic, the Plimsoll line was introduced to prevent overloading.

European Union classification
Since 1998 all new leisure boats and barges built in Europe between 2.5m and 24m must comply with the EU's Recreational Craft Directive (RCD). The Directive establishes four categories that permit the allowable wind and wave conditions for vessels in each class:
Class A - the boat may safely navigate any waters.
Class B - the boat is limited to offshore navigation. (Winds up to Force 8 & waves up to 4 metres) 
Class C - the boat is limited to inshore (coastal) navigation. (Winds up to Force 6 & waves up to 2 metres) 
Class D - the boat is limited to rivers, canals and small lakes. (Winds up to Force 4 & waves up to 0.5 metres)
Europe is the main producer of recreational boats (the second production in the world is located in Poland). European brands are known all over the world - in fact, these are the brands that created RCD and set the standard for shipyards around the world.

See also

 Abora
 Barge
 Cabin cruiser
 Car float
 Dinghy
 Dory
 Flatboat
 Halkett boat
 Inflatable boat
 Launch (boat)
 Log canoe
 Narrowboat
 Naval architecture
 Panga (boat)
 Pirogue
 Poveiro
 Rescue craft
 Sampan
 Ship's boat
 Skiff
 Tour boat
 Traditional fishing boats
 Tûranor PlanetSolar
 Yacht

References

External links

 University of Washington Libraries Digital Collections – Freshwater and Marine Image Bank, (enter search term "vessels" for images of boats and vessels.)

 
Watercraft
Fishing equipment